Richard Steven Ellis (May 15, 1947 – July 2, 2018) was an American mathematician.

He was born on May 15, 1947, in Brookline, Massachusetts, to parents Murray and Helen. Ellis graduated from Boston Latin School and attended Harvard University, where he studied German literature and mathematics. He pursued graduate study at the Courant Institute of Mathematical Sciences. In 1972, he received his PhD from the New York University for his thesis Chapman-Eskog-Hilbert Expansion for Models of the Boltzman Equation under the supervision of Henry McKean. He began teaching at Northwestern University and left for the University of Massachusetts Amherst in 1975. In 1984, he improved a key result in large deviations theory originally due to Jürgen Gärtner, which is now known as Gärtner-Ellis Theorem. He was named fellow of the Institute of Mathematical Statistics in 1999. Ellis died of bile duct cancer in New York City on July 2, 2018, aged 71.

References

External links 

 Oral history interview transcript with Richard Ellis on 27 July 2007, American Institute of Physics, Niels Bohr Library & Archives

1947 births
2018 deaths
20th-century American mathematicians
People from Brookline, Massachusetts
Writers from Boston
Harvard College alumni
Courant Institute of Mathematical Sciences alumni
Northwestern University faculty
University of Massachusetts Amherst faculty
Deaths from cancer in New York (state)
Deaths from cholangiocarcinoma
Fulbright alumni